Bernard Clinton Pawley was an Anglican priest.

He was born on 24 January 1911, educated at Portsmouth Grammar School and Wadham College, Oxford and ordained in 1936. After curacies in Stoke on Trent and Leeds he was a chaplain to the British Armed Forces between 1940 and 1945. When peace returned he was Rector of Elland and then a canon residentiary at Ely Cathedral. After a brief spell in a similar role at St Paul's Cathedral he was appointed Archdeacon of Canterbury in 1972, a post he held for nine years. A noted commentator on Vatican affairs, he died on 15 November 1981.

References

1911 births
1981 deaths
People educated at The Portsmouth Grammar School
Alumni of Wadham College, Oxford
Archdeacons of Canterbury